The Principal of the University of St Andrews is the chief executive and chief academic of the University. The Principal is responsible for the overall running of the university, presiding over the main academic body of the university, known as the Senatus Academicus (Academic Senate). The Senate has the responsibility for superintending and regulating teaching in the University, including the regulations for the conferring of degrees, and the Senate also administers the property and revenues of the University (subject to the authority of the University Court.) The Principal is appointed by the University Court. The current office of Principal dates to 1858 with the passage of the Universities (Scotland) Act 1858.

The Principal is, by convention, appointed as Vice-Chancellor of the University of St Andrews by the Chancellor, and can confer degrees in the absence of the Chancellor.

As of April 2017, the Principal was Professor Sally Mapstone, who had previously served as Pro-Vice-Chancellor of the University of Oxford.

History
Until the mid 1700s the University comprised three colleges and the Provosts of St Salvator's College and Principals of St Leonard's College and St Mary's College were responsible for the oversight of their own institutions. In 1747 the Colleges of St Leonard's and St Salvator's were combined into the United College, with the University now led by two principals. The modern office of Principal dates from 1858, with the passage of the University (Scotland) Act 1858. From 1858 until 1889 the senior of the two Principals (of the United College or St Mary's) undertook the responsibilities of Principal of the University, when in 1889 the Principal of the United College was made Principal of the University. The University of St Andrews Act 1952 created the Principal as a separate office, to be appointed by the Monarch of the United Kingdom.

The power to appoint the Principal is vested in the University Court by Schedule 2 of the Universities (Scotland) Act 1966. The Education (Scotland) Act 1981 transferred the power to the Court, with the previous power to appoint the Principal being vested in the Monarch of the United Kingdom. The Principal is also a member of the University Court, as required by Ordinance 121 of the University.

In 2009, Professor Louise Richardson was the first woman appointed as Principal, with her successor, Professor Sally Mapstone being the second woman appointed to the office. Professor Mapstone had previously served as Pro-Vice-Chancellor (Education) at the University of Oxford.

Vice-Chancellor
The Principal is, by convention, appointed as Vice-Chancellor of the University of St Andrews by the Chancellor, and can confer degrees in the absence of the Chancellor. The position of Vice-Chancellor does not confer any other powers or responsibility on the Principal.

List of Principals and Vice-Chancellors

1837-1859 Sir David Brewster
1859-1886 Reverend John Tulloch
1886-1915 Sir James Donaldson
1915-1920 Sir John Herkless
1921-1952 Sir James Irvine
1953-1966 Sir Thomas Malcolm Knox
1966-1986 Professor John Steven Watson
1986-1999 Professor Struther Arnott
2001-2008 Dr Brian Lang
2009-2015 Professor Dame Louise Richardson
2016-present Professor Dame Sally Mapstone

See also
 Governance of the University of St Andrews
 Chancellor of the University of St Andrews
 Rector of the University of St Andrews

References

University of St Andrews
St Andrews
St Andrews